St. George's Anglican Church is a Neo-Gothic stone church located in Georgina listed under the Ontario Heritage Act.

References

Religious organizations established in 1839
Churches completed in 1839
19th-century Anglican church buildings in Canada
Anglican church buildings in Ontario
Buildings and structures in the Regional Municipality of York